Baldersheim is a commune in the Haut-Rhin department in Alsace in north-eastern France. It forms part of the Mulhouse Alsace Agglomération, the inter-communal local government body for the Mulhouse conurbation.

Etymology
Baldersheim was first attested as Balthersheim in 976, and is of Germanic origin. The toponym derives from the genitive of anthroponym Baldo (see *balþaz), with suffix -heim pointing to Germanic *-haim. This toponymic pattern is common in the departments of Moselle, Bas Rhin and Haut Rhin.

See also
 Communes of the Haut-Rhin department

References

Communes of Haut-Rhin